Marpolia has been interpreted as a cyanobacterium, but also resembles the modern cladophoran green algae.  It is known from the Middle Cambrian Burgess shale and Early Cambrian deposits from the Czech Republic.  It comprises a dense mass of entangled, twisted filaments.  It may have been free-floating or grown on other objects, although there is no evidence of attachment structures.  40 specimens of Marpolia are known from the Greater Phyllopod bed, where they comprise 0.08% of the community.

References

External links 
 

Burgess Shale fossils
Wheeler Shale
Prehistoric bacteria

Cambrian genus extinctions